Enghave Plads station is an underground Copenhagen Metro station located at Enghave Plads in the Vesterbro district of Copenhagen, Denmark. The station is on the City Circle Line (M3), between Copenhagen Central Station and Frederiksberg Allé, and is in fare zone 1. Nearby landmarks include the music venue Vega, Enghave Park and the shopping and restaurant street Istedgade.

History
The station was opened on 29 September 2019 together with 16 other stations of the line.

Design
The escalator shaft is clad with red, ceramic panels, a reference to the red brick buildings that line the square.

Service

References

City Circle Line (Copenhagen Metro) stations
Railway stations opened in 2019
2019 establishments in Denmark
Railway stations in Denmark opened in the 21st century